The Helleh River is a river which is formed by the confluence of the Shapur River and the Dalaki River which run from the Zagros Mountains. At the confluence, which is near the city of Bushehr, there are wetlands which are important for migrating birds.  The Helleh River enters the Persian Gulf at the north end of Bushehr Bay where it forms a delta.

References

External links

Rivers of Bushehr Province
Landforms of Bushehr Province
Landforms of Fars Province